Sympistis sesmu is a moth of the family Noctuidae first described by James T. Troubridge in 2008. It is found in the United States from eastern Oregon to Washington

The wingspan is 30–36 mm. Adults are on wing from Late August to September.

References

sesmu
Moths described in 2008